{
  "type": "FeatureCollection",
  "features": [
    {
      "type": "Feature",
      "properties": {},
      "geometry": {
        "type": "Point",
        "coordinates": [
          76.262853294611,
          12.56015541614
        ]
      }
    }
  ]
}

Saligrama is a new sub-district of Mysore district, situated on the northern bank of the river Cauvery [Kaveri]. This place is esteemed as sacred by the Shri Vaishnavas on account of its having been the residence of Sri Ramanujacharya. It is the headquarters of Saligrama Taluk. It was established as a new taluk carving out of K.R.Nagar taluk with effect from 31.12.2020 and become ninth taluk of Mysore district of Karnataka, India.

A number of religious sites, famous old temples - including Sri Yoga Narasimha Swamy Temple, Sri Ramanuja Sripada Teertham, Sri Jyothirmaheswara Swamy Temple,  Jain Basadis, and an Ashram are located in the town.

History
Swamy Ramanuja arrived in Karnataka where the local tribals received him in this place. The local people who were averse to Swamy Ramanuja conspired a plan to do away with him.  Swamy Ramanuja learning their evil intentions ordered Mudaliandan Swamy to place his feet in the drinking water pond in that area  now called Saligrama. At Saligrama, by  partaking this Sripada theertham, the minds of the evildoers changed and they fell at Swamy Ramanuja lotus feet  seeking forgiveness.  Such was the greatness of our Mudaliandan Swamy.

When persecuted by the Chola king Kulottunga, Ramanujacharya is said to have fled the Chola country and first stayed at Vahnipushkarini (the place now known as 'Mirle') from where he moved on to Saligrama.

Etymology

Swamy Ramanuja named this place as "Saligramam" which is near Melkote.  Even today this pond is maintained by the archakas who ensures that no intruder pollutes the pond by locking the gate.  There is a small temple opposite to this pond in which Swamy Ramanuja's Thiruvadi chuvadugal are worshipped.  There is also a deity  of Swamy Ramanuja in Sesharoopa near the garbagriha.

Demographics

Population 
According to census data released in 2011 by the Government of Karnataka, total area of Saligrama is spread across 1109.5 hectares with a total population of 11836 persons [Male - 5869 and Female - 5967] and 2976 households with an average of 4 persons per household.

Literacy 
As per the report the total literacy rate is 71.93% [with Male - 77.33% and Female - 66.59%]. Comparing it with the previous census data, the total literacy rate has increased by 6% with 4% increase in the male and 7% increase in the female literacy rate.

Growth in population 
Presently, there is a 0.5% increase in the total population of the village as it was about 12000 before 10 years. The rate of growth in female population has gone up by 2.9% and male population has decreased by -1.9%. So, the rate of population growth in female is 4.8% higher compared to their counterpart.

Sex ratio 
According to the recent census, there are 1017 females per 1000 males. The overall sex ratio has gone up by 47 females per 1000 males during the period of 10 years. The Child sex ratio here has also increased by 170 girls per 1000 boys at the same duration. For the age group of below 6 years, there are 1060 girls per 1000 boys.

Work profile 
Out of total population, 41% are engaged either in main work or in marginal works - 62% male [55% full time and 7% part time] and 20% female [14% are full time and 7% are marginal] are working.

Land usage

Education

There is a public library.

Pre-Primary school - 1
 Primary school - 9
Higher Primary school
 Secondary School - 2
 Senior Secondary school - 3
 Pre-university college
 Govt ITI college -1
 Pvt ITI college -1
Government First grade college

Temples

 Sri Yoganarasimha Swamy Temple
 Sri Jyothirmaheshwara Temple
 Sri Ramanuja Sripada Teertham and Temple
 Hanuman Temple
Kote Anjaneya
 Ganapati Temple
 Shaneshwara Swamy Temple
 Kalikamba Temple
 Shri 1008 Bhagwan Neminath 
  Digambar Jain basadi
 Pete Ananthanatha basadi
 Parshwanath basadi
 Chathurtha basadi(Bhakthamara 
  basadi)
 kote Ananthanatha basadi
 Gurugalare hill.

Postal and Courier Services

A public Post-office is situated and there are many private courier services available here, also, e-market product delivery services are rendered on a daily basis.

Transportation

State Highway-85,  State Highway-108 and State Highway-120 pass through Saligrama town and frequent bus facility is available to Mysore.  A public bus stand along with the private facilities such as - buses, taxies, auto-rickshaws, which makes transportation connectivity easier. 
There is no railway connectivity to Saligrama. The nearest Railway station is Krishnarajanagara [24 kms]. Saligrama is located equidistant from Mysuru Junction railway station and Hassan Junction railway station (approx.60 kms). Nearest major airports are Kannur International Airport, Kerala and Kempegowda International Airport, located at 150 kms and 210 kms, respectively.

Healthcare

A government hospital and many private clinics are situated. Also, there are 7 Medicine shops.

Law & Order 
There is a Police-Station located to maintain the law and order, it also covers the small neighboring villages.

Notable people 

Parvathamma Rajkumar, Kannada film industry producer
S. A. Chinne Gowda, Kannada film producer and distributor
 S.A.Srinivas, Kannada film producer and younger brother of Parvathamma Rajakumar
 S.A. Govindaraju, film producer and younger brother of Parvathamma Rajakumar
 S. A.  Ramegowda,  elder brother of Parvathamma Rajakumar  
Sa. Ra. Govindu  Kannada film industry producer
S.H. Thammiah,  first MLA of K.R.Nagar assembly constitution

Gallery

See also

Kanive
Konanur, Hassan
Ramanathapura, Hassan
Kushalanagar
Hole Narasipur
Keralapura
 Mysore
 Mangalore
 Arkalgud

References

Cities and towns in Mysore district